Cheleti Abol Tabol Meyeti Pagol Pagol is a 2015 Bangladeshi romantic thriller film directed by Saif Chandan and produced by Neel Nokkhotro Entertainment. The film stars Kayes Arju and Airin Sultana in the lead roles.

Cast
 Kayes Arju
 Airin Sultana
 Shahed Sharif Khan
 Nishat Zarin Orin
 Sabina Rima
 Mukit Zakaria
 Monira Mithu
 Kochi Khandokar
 Pavel Islam
 Lipika Ahmed Mazumder
 Ayon Chowdhury
 Bishal Boshir
 Lutfor Rahaman
 Rafa Naim
 Puthi Ahmed (in item song maggie noodles)

Production
Shooting started from February 2013.

The film opened on 9 October 2015 across more than 50 theatres. Audience numbers were underwhelming.

Soundtracks

See also
 List of Bangladeshi films of 2014

References

2015 films
2010s romantic action films
Bengali-language Bangladeshi films
Bangladeshi romantic action films
Films scored by Arfin Rumey
2010s Bengali-language films